Cockayne may refer to:

 Cockayne or "Cockaigne", a mythical land
 Cockayne (surname)
 Cockayne baronets
 Cockayne syndrome
 Cockayne, North Yorkshire, a hamlet and ridge in North Yorkshire, England
 Cockaigne (In London Town), an overture by Edward Elgar

See also
 George Cokayne (1825–1911), English officer of arms
 Cocaine (disambiguation)